Hassan Khairat (Arabic: حسن خيرات; born 13 November 1987) is a football player .

References

 Saudi League Profile

1987 births
Living people
Saudi Arabian footballers
Al Hilal SFC players
Al-Raed FC players
Ettifaq FC players
Al-Kawkab FC players
Saudi Professional League players
Saudi Second Division players
Association football defenders